The 2015–16 season is the club's first season in the Scottish Championship and their first appearance in the second tier of Scottish football since 2005–06 season. St Mirren will also compete in the Challenge Cup, the League Cup and the Scottish Cup.

Month by month review

May
On 29 May 2015, new manager Ian Murray announced the departure of Yoann Arquin, Marián Kello, Jeroen Tesselaar, Mark Williams and Mo Yaqub. Loan signings James Dayton and Emmanuel Sonupe also left the club today.

June
On 1 June, former manager Gary Teale left the club by 'mutual consent'. Teale played for the club for four seasons, and managed for a six-month period.

On 8 June, it was confirmed that Gregg Wylde, Viktor Genev and youngster Adam Brown have now left the club. Along with the other recent departures, it means eleven players have now left the club following relegation.

On 14 June, chairman Stewart Gilmour confirmed that midfielder John McGinn has started legal action against the club, following a previous training ground incident in which he was 'speared' by teammate Steven Thompson.

On 16 June, midfielder Alan Gow signed a new one-year deal with the club.

On 25 June, midfielder Scott Agnew signed a new one-year deal with the club, after leaving Dumbarton when his contract expired.

On 26 June, club captain Steven Thompson signed a new one-year deal with the club.

On 29 June, midfielder Stuart Carswell signed a one-year deal with the club, after leaving Motherwell in the summer.

July
On 3 July, Saints signed 19-year-old Paul McMullan on a one-year loan deal from Celtic. McMullan can played as a forward or as a wide player.

On 20 July, the club announced the departure of Thomas Reilly after he failed to win a new contract during pre-season. Reilly leaves Saints after four years, having made 47 appearances and scoring once.

On 23 July, defender Luke Conlan signed for the club on a one-year loan deal from Burnley.

On 24 July, the club signed former Burnley midfielder Cameron Howieson on a one-year deal. The 20-year-old is a New Zealand international.

On 31 July, midfielder John McGinn left the club, joining Hibernian on a four-year deal.

August
On 3 August, Saints were drawn at home to Livingston in the 2nd Round of the Scottish League Cup.

On 4 August, striker Calum Gallagher signed on a one-year contract from Rangers. The 20-year-old will wear the number 22 shirt.

On 13 August, Saints signed goalkeeper Jamie Langfield on a two-year contract from Aberdeen. Langfield takes up a player-coach role.

On 19 August, it was confirmed that defender Jason Naismith had suffered serious knee ligament damage in the recent 2–1 home defeat to Dumbarton in the Scottish Championship. He is expected to be out for a period of six-months.

On 20 August. former Dundee United defender Keith Watson signed a six-month deal with the club. He was assigned squad number 20.

Also on this day, Saints were drawn at home to League One side Dunfermline Athletic in the Quarter-finals of the Challenge Cup. The tie will be played on 10 October 2015.

On 26 August, Saints signed 20-year-old striker Lawrence Shankland on a one-year loan deal from Aberdeen.

On 28 August, veteran defender Andy Webster signed a one-year deal with Saints with the option of a further year.

September
On 2 September, Saints signed 19-year-old striker Jaison McGrath after he was released by Celtic.

On 22 September, goalkeeper Mark Ridgers joined Kilmarnock on an emergency loan deal until January 2016. This was due to a goalkeeping crisis at the Ayrshire club, leaving them with no available stopper for their upcoming matches.

October
On 12 October, Saints were drawn away to either Rangers or Livingston in the Semi-finals of the Scottish Challenge Cup.

On 30 October, defender Craig Reid signed an emergency three-month loan with the club, after it was confirmed that defender Keith Watson had suffered ankle ligament damage.

November
On 2 November, assistant manager Mark Spalding left the club by mutual consent, following Saints poor run of form since the start of the season.

On 3 November, former Saints manager Alex Miller was appointed new assistant manager to Ian Murray.

December
On 1 December, Saints were drawn at home to Partick Thistle in the fourth round of the Scottish Cup. The tie will be played 9/10 January 2016

On 12 December, manager Ian Murray resigned after a 1–0 defeat to Dumbarton. Saints had won just two league matches since Murray was appointed in the summer.

On 19 December, Saints appointed Alex Rae as new club manager. He was given an initial 18-month contract, tying him to the club until the summer of 2017.

On 29 December, defender Keith Watson extended his short term deal until the end of the season.

January
On 1 January, the club named David Farrell as assistant manager to Alex Rae.

On 2 January, manager Alex Rae confirmed that loanees Luke Conlan and Craig Reid had returned to their parent clubs.

On 14 January, goalkeeper Mark Ridgers left the club by mutual consent, after his loan at Kilmarnock expired.

On 15 January, midfielder Rocco Quinn signed for Saints from Ross County, until the end of the season. He was assigned squad number 27.

On 27 January, striker David Clarkson signed on loan for the club until the end of the season from Motherwell. He has been assigned squad number 24.

On 29 January, midfielder Alex Cooper signed until the end of the season after being released by Falkirk.

On the same day defender Gary Irvine signed until the summer of 2017, after being released by Dundee.

Also on this day, youngster Lewis McLear joined Scottish League Two side Stirling Albion on loan until the end of the season.

February
On 1 February, Celtic loanee Paul McMullan returned to his parent club, as Saints ended his loan spell early. In total he played 22 games for the club, scoring once.

April
On 30 April, Rocco Quinn signed a two-year contract extension, tying him to the club until the summer of 2018.

Results & fixtures

Pre season / Friendlies

Scottish Championship

Scottish Challenge Cup

Scottish League Cup

Scottish Cup

Player statistics

Captains

Squad information
Last updated 2 May 2016

|-
|colspan="14"|Players who left the club during the season:

|}

Disciplinary record
Includes all competitive matches.
Last updated 2 May 2016

Team statistics

League table

Division summary

Management statistics
Last updated on 2 May 2016

Transfers

In

Out

See also
List of St Mirren F.C. seasons

Notes

References

St Mirren F.C. seasons
St Mirren